The Oerlikon GDF or Oerlikon 35 mm twin cannon is a towed anti-aircraft gun made by Oerlikon Contraves (renamed as Rheinmetall Air Defence AG following the merger with Rheinmetall in 2009). The system was originally designated 2 ZLA/353 ML but this was later changed to GDF-001. It was developed in the late 1950s and is used by around 30 countries.

Design and development
The system uses twin autocannons, firing 35×228mm NATO-standard ammunition. It was originally designated 353 MK and is now designated as the KD series. The same KD series 35mm cannons are used in the Leopard 1 based Gepard and Type 74 tank based Type 87 SPAAG and Marksman self-propelled anti-aircraft guns (SPAAG). The system could be paired with the off-gun (remote) Super Fledermaus fire control radar, which in the late 1970s was upgraded to the Skyguard system. The weapons was aimed either directly, by way of an advanced sighting system, or automatically, by locking onto the target with radar. Early models carried 112 rounds ready to fire, and an additional 126 stored on the chassis as reloads. Later versions with automated reloading carry 280 rounds total. A typical engagement burst is 28 rounds.

In 1980 an upgraded model, the GDF-002 was produced, which featured an improved sight, and the ability to be directed by an off-gun digital control system. A few years later a third version of the system was being produced, the GDF-003, which was broadly similar to the GDF-002, but included some enhancements like self-lubricating weapons and integrated protective covers.

In 1985 a further upgraded model was produced, the GDF-005, which was introduced, featuring the Gunking 3D computer-controlled sight with an integrated laser range-finder and digital control system. The GDF-005 also introduced an automated ammunition-handling system, which eliminated the need for the two reloaders, reducing the crew from 3 to 1.

The guns are usually transported by a 5-tonne 6×6 truck.

KD series cannons

Development of the KD series cannon began around 1952 soon after Oerlikon calculated that 35 mm was the optimum calibre for an anti-aircraft gun. The KD series cannons were a design adapted from the post-war 20 mm KAA 204 Gk cannon. Several designs were developed, including a water-cooled design, designated Mk 352, which was tested by the U.S. Navy.
The final design was the Mk 323, which was developed in two variants, a belt-fed version the KDA, and a linkless version the KDC, fed by seven-round clips. Both designs are gas-operated, with a propped-lock locking system.

Super Fledermaus

The Super Fledermaus fire control system was designed and built by the then separate Contraves company. It consists of a four-wheeled towed trailer with an E/F band pulse doppler search radar with a range of around 15 km and a pulse doppler tracking radar operating in the J band, also with a range of 15 km. It was also used as the fire control system on the Gepard SPAAG.

Skyguard

The Skyguard is a fire control system  introduced in the 1960s to replace the Contraves Super Fledermaus system in the Swiss Air Force. It is produced by Oerlikon-Buehrle (now Rheinmetall Air Defence). Updated version were fielded in 1975, 1995 and 2010. It's an all weather low to medium altitude (up to 3,000 m) air defence system with the maximum effective distance of 4,000 m.

The Skyguard fire control system performs air surveillance, target acquisition, calculation of the derivative-action values and control of the twin 35 mm guns. Pulse doppler search radar, pulse doppler tracking radar and co-axial television camera are mounted on the roof of the towed trailer. Skyguard is operated by four people. The radar is deployed quickly through the use of hydraulic systems for antenna erection. The trailer houses the crew of two and a small power generator.

A typical fire unit consists of two twin 35 mm gun platforms with a single Skyguard fire control radar. Skyguard systems can also incorporate an optional SAM module based on the GDF's mount and radar system but with the guns replaced by four missile canisters. It can be armed with either RIM-7 Sea Sparrow or Aspide missiles.

The Skyguard radar system was used in the German Air Force for surveillance of low-altitude flight zones. In Taiwanese service, the system includes the Sky Sentinel radar, one 35 mm Oerlikon twin gun and an AIM-7 Sparrow Missile Launcher. Greek service the Skyguard system with RIM-7M is known as the VELOS. In Spanish service, Toledo is a Skyguard system with Aspide launchers where the fire control unit has been replaced with Skydor from Navantia.

History
 1982: The system was widely used by Argentine forces during the Falklands War. The Skyguard radar system was employed by the 601 Antiaircraft Artillery Group and the Super Fledermaus by the 1st Group of the Argentinian Air Force. The Skyguard succeeded in shooting down a Sea Harrier (XZ450) on 4 May 1982 at Goose Green. This resulted in a shift of tactics, so that British aircraft largely operated outside the weapons system's range. An RAF Harrier (XZ988) was shot down by these cannons again over Goose Green on 27 May. The system was also employed in direct fire mode against British paratroopers during the Battle of Goose Green, killing two and wounding 11 and stopping the advance of two companies. The guns were involved in two deadly friendly fire incidents during the campaign. The first took place on 1 May 1982, when a GADA 601 battery fired three burst of 35 mm rounds at an Argentine Mirage III attempting to make an emergency landing at Stanley, after the aircraft had been already targeted by Argentine Marine Hispano-Suiza HS-831 30mm guns deployed along the town. The aircraft fell in flames north of the airport, killing the pilot. The other friendly shootdown occurred at Goose-Green, when one A-4 Skyhawk flew by mistake over a banned zone, and was shot down with the loss of the pilot. The Argentine Air Force conceded that this time the incident was triggered by the pilot's navigation error. The Skyguard radars were targeted by the RAF during Operation Black Buck on 31 May and 3 June. One Skyguard radar was destroyed by shrapnel from a Shrike missile strike and four operators died as a result. Another Harrier (XW919) was presumably hit by 35 mm splinters over Sapper Hill on 12 June and sustained heavy damage. The aircraft was later declared out of service. There was a further direct-fire mission conducted against British troops on Wireless Ridge, just hours before the Argentinian surrender. After being disabled by their operators the guns were captured by British forces. Fifteen guns and five Skyguard units were captured and shipped back to Britain in "Operation Skyguard". Four of the Skyguard sets were in good enough condition to be refurbished by BMARC in Britain with the fifth being damaged by its operators prior to capture so severely that refurbishment was not economically viable. Twelve guns and four Skyguard radars were put into British service operated by a reserve wing of the RAF Regiment 1339 wing Royal Auxiliary Air Force, comprising 2729 Squadron and 2890 Squadron Royal Auxiliary Air Force Regiment, based at RAF Waddington with an additional two new Skyguard units being procured from the Manufacturer. The RAuxAF Regiment used these guns and radar for about 10 years but defence cuts, coupled with the rising cost of ammunition and replacement gun barrels, forced the withdrawal from service of the very popular and reliable system.  One of the guns is on display at the RAF Regiment Heritage Centre at RAF Honington, and the Skyguard radar system is still in use by the RAF to monitor military low flying in the UK.
 12 October 2007: Nine South African National Defence Force (SANDF) soldiers were killed and 14 injured by the system during a training exercise at the SANDF Battle School at Lohatla in the Northern Cape province. A line of eight cannons were engaging a tank hulk in manual ground fire with the guns at low elevation and the maximum traverse of the barrels secured by safety poles and tethers. The rightmost gun jammed while firing and had to be repaired by technicians. Shortly after the gun was cleared to fire again, the gun malfunctioned, entered automatic mode, broke through the traversal-restriction safety mechanisms and began firing, striking the other guns along the firing line.  Initial reports suggested that the malfunction was caused when the gun underwent an unexplained hang fire of the explosive 35mm ammunition in the magazines, causing the turret to swing uncontrolled through 360 degrees, firing wildly until it exhausted its remaining ammunition. A statement issued by the South African Defense Minister, Mosiuoa Lekota, however, stated that the gun had inexplicably traversed 90 degrees to the left, breaking through the safety mechanisms, and fired only a -second-long burst, striking all of the soldiers located on the right-hand side of their guns. The accident report published by the SANDF in January 2008 blamed "undetected mechanical failure—which the manufacturers of an anti-aircraft gun allegedly kept secret". The report says the gun malfunctioned because a spring pin, which is the size of a matchstick, sheared.  Other sources blamed poor training and safety procedures in the SANDF.

Ammunition

Designation:
 HEI: High Explosive Incendiary (-T—Tracer)
 SAPHEI: Semi-Armour Piercing High Explosive Incendiary
 FAPDS: Frangible Armour Piercing Discarding Sabot
 TP: Target Practice (-T—Tracer)
 AHEAD: Anti-missile rounds, that fire "152 heavy tungsten metal sub-projectiles".
 ATOM 35mm: Aselsan ATOM 35mm is a airburst round, that fire tungsten metal pellets as sub-projectiles. It is mainly designed to destroy cruise missiles, anti-ship missiles, unmanned aerial vehicles, precision guided weapons, conventional and rotary-wing aircraft and various ground targets.
Specification:
Length of complete round : 387 mm
Fuze : Time-programmable base fuze with electronic selfdestruct function
Effective range : 4000 m
Maximum range : 12500 m

Norwegian NammoIn addition to Oerlikon, supplies at least some variants of this ammunition. Norwegian ammunition was supplied to Ukraine in 2022 for use in the GDF guns in its Flakpanzer Gepard anti-aircraft systems, but it was found not to be compatible, requiring modification.

Versions

 GDF-001 / 2 ZLA/353 MK: XABA sight
 GDF-002: Introduced in 1980. Improved Ferranti sight and digital data bus. The gun has 112 rounds ready and 126 in reserve (238 rounds total)
 GDF-003: Minor enhancements including protective covers and automatic weapon lubrication.
 GDF-005: Introduced in 1985. Fitted with Gunking 3D computer-controlled sight with a laser range finder and digital fire control system. Integrated power supply and diagnostics. 280 rounds on the gun and an automatic re-loading system.
 GDF-006: GDF-001/002/003 upgraded with AHEAD system.
 GDF-007: GDF-005 upgraded with AHEAD system.
 GDF-009: Unveiled at IDEF 2015, held in May 2015 in Istanbul. To date, its exterior significantly changed, although the installation has retained the design of the original serial versions of the systems. Unlike other variants, this one relies on an internal power source. The GDF-009 model is based on a four-wheeled carriage, and is raised off the ground by three stabilisers when deployed in the firing position. It also features an automatic levelling system that can compensate for a maximum tilt angle of up to 7°.Mounted on the forward part of the carriage is the integrated battery, which functions as the gun's power supply unit and can be recharged from an external source if required.
 AHEAD: An upgrade for the GDF series guns built around a special projectile which explodes at a pre-calculated point in front of the target, sending a cone of 152 tungsten sub-projectiles at the target. Used by Canada, Pakistan, Greece, Oman, Spain, Taiwan, and Chile (unconfirmed).
MKE GDF-003B: Turkish version of 35 mm GDF series. The gun of the system manufactured under licence by Turkish company Mechanical and Chemical Industry Corporation.   
MKE/Aselsan GDF-003B Modernized: MKE GDF-003B system modernized by another Turkish company Aselsan.  MKE made 35mm guns linked with an Aselsan made Fire and Command Control System. The system has similarities with Skyguard system. The Fire and Command Control System consists of Aselsan made 3D search radar, fire control radar, electro-optical (E/O) sensors and other electronics. Each weapons system can fire up to 1100 rpm (2 x 550rpm) to an effective range of 4 km. The upgradation enables the system to fire Aselsan ATOM 35mm airburst round which explodes at a pre-calculated point in front of the target, sending a cone of tungsten pellets at the target. The gun can also fire HEI and TP-T  ammunitions. The concept of ATOM 35mm air burst ammunition came up in order to increase the efficiency of the gun systems against modern targets including  fixed/rotary wing aircraft, cruise missiles, air-to-ground missiles and unmanned aerial vehicles and other precision guided weapons. Aselsan Fire and Command Control  system can also incorporate a low altitude air defense SAM along with 35 mm gun platform. Like the GDF-009 each gun platform equipped with the integrated battery, which functions as the gun's power supply unit and can be recharged from an external source if required.
 KORKUT: Turkish  Self-propelled (SPAAG) variant designed by Aselsan. The system developed from modernized GDF-003B and based around the amphibious capable FNSS ACV-30. KDC-02 cannon of the system manufactured under licence by MKE. Each Korkut system compromises of a command and control vehicle and three weapons platform vehicles. The command and control vehicle has the 3D search radar with an effective radar range of 70 km. Each weapon platform vehicle carries enclosed twin 35 mm cannons, fire control radar and electro-optical (E/O) sensors.
 Aselsan GOKDENIZ: CIWS version of KORKUT. The system's primary purpose is to defend against sea skimming anti-ship missiles, unmanned aerial vehicles and other precision guided weapons.
 Gepard: Self-propelled (SPAAG) version of the system based around the Leopard 1.
 Marksman: Self-propelled version of the system based around the Marksman turret, which could be fitted on numerous tank chassis. The only model that went into production was a version based on the T-55AM chassis for Finland, seven systems of the ITPSV 90 Marksman were produced. After having been moved to reserve storage since 2010, the Marksman turrets had their electronics modernized and were transferred over to Leopard 2 chassis in 2015, creating the ITPSV Leopard 2 Marksman.
 Type 87: Japanese SPAAG using the system.
 PZA Loara: Polish SPAAG based on the PT-91 tank.
 Type 90 (PG99): Chinese licensed copy of GDF-002.  The PG99 is a towed anti-aircraft gun suitable for point and coastal air defence. It is usually deployed near military bases, airfields, tunnels, islands, and along the coast to defend Sea Land of Communication (SLOC), ports, bridges and other important assets.
MAA-01:Myanmar's locally made variant using Chinese GDF guns.Similar to Type-90.
 CS/SA1: Chinese upgrade of GDF-002. Mounted on the 6×6 SX2190 truck, the PG99 (CS/SA1) is a self-propelled variant of the Type 90 35 mm AA system, previously available only as a towed AA piece.
 Type 09 SPAAA: Self-propelled version of the system based around the Type 90. First appeared in 2015 China Victory Day Parade.
 Samavat: Iranian version of these guns with night vision sight and used with Skyguard & Super Fledermaus FC radars.
 Amoun: Egyptian version of Skyguard & Sparrow SAM.

Operators

 : 38 GDF-002 Army with Skyguard, 6 GDF-002 Air Force with Super Fledermaus FC radar.
 : 74 GDF-005 Army, Air Force 18 GDF-005 with 37 Skyguard FC radar
 : 12 GDF-005 units, used with Skyguard FC radar.
 :  4-8 Oerlikon GDF-009 anti aircraft gun systems have been ordered with Skyguard 3 fire control radar.  In 2019, the gun systems have been tested at Cox's Bazar.
 : 38 GDF-001 with updated Super Fledermaus and Brazilian made Skyguard FC radars. To be fitted with the Saber M60 radar.
 : GDF-002 and Type-90 units
 : 20 GDF-005 units and 10 Skyguard FC radars in stock for emergency
 : 24 GDF-005/007 units, used with Skyguard FC radar.
 : licensed copy of GDF-002 as the Type 90, 400 units with Skyguard FC radar
 : 75 GDF-005 units in reserve
 : 30 GDF-005 units used with Skyguard and Aspide SAM
 : 30 GDF-003 units
 : 72 Amoun units used with Skyguard and Sparrow SAM
 : 16 units. Known as 35 ITK 88
 : On the Flugabwehrkanonenpanzer Gepard (self-propelled anti-aircraft gun)
 : 24 GDF-002 units upgraded to GDF-006 AHEAD, 12 upgraded Skyguard FC radars, used with Sparrow SAM
 : 92 GDF-002 units. Iran claims it is producing/refurbishing these guns. Used with Skyguard & Super Fledermaus FC radars.
 : 8 GDF
 : some 70 GDF-001 units, used with updated Super Fledermaus FC radars. Made under a joint venture with Japan Steel Works for the 35mm gun and Mitsubishi Electric Corporation for the rest of the system 52 On the Type 87 (self-propelled anti-aircraft gun)
 : 36 GDF-003 units, used with Skyguard FC radar.
 : 12 GDF-005 (Amoun) units, used with Skyguard and Sparrow SAM
 : 28 GDF-005 units, used with Skyguard FC radar.
 : 10 locally made MAA-01, (Type-90) as of 2017.
 : 16 GDF-002 units
 : 10 GDF-005 units AHEAD modified, used with Skyguard FC radar.
 : estimated 180 GDF-005 units, 60 units AHEAD modified, used with Skyguard FC radar.
 : 43 Flugabwehrkanonenpanzer Gepard systems and 72 GDF-003 units
 : 128 GDF-005 modified units. Used with Skyguard FC radars.
 : 58 units : 34 GDF-001 and 24 GDF-002 units. Fire-control radar locally upgraded 
 : 102 GDF-002 (100 Mk1 GDF-002 units in 2004 were sold for $500 000) + 48 modified GDF-005 units. Upgrading to the Skyshield system, GDF-006 AHEAD and GDF-007 AHEAD standard by 2017. Some 169 Oerlikon GDF-00? were acquired by the SADF along with 75 Super Fledermaus FC radars.
 : 92 GDF-007 upgraded from GDF-005 between 2003 and 2006. With 27 Skydor and 18 Skyguard FC radars.
 : Some 24 GDF-005 modified units (from a total of 264 GDF-001/002 units) used with Skyguard FC Radar.
 : 24 Skyguard "Sky Sentinel" fire control radars linked to some 50 GDF-003 35 mm twin guns. Upgraded to GDF-006 to fire AHEAD rounds since 2009.
 : 8 GDF-007, used with 4x Skyguard 3 FC radar units.
 : 35 mm Oerlikon gun produced under licence by MKE. 120 GDF-003 units, Turkish version known as MKE GDF-003B. Multiple gun systems upgraded to GDF-003B Modernized with Aselsan Fire and Command Control System by Aselsan.
 : 30 on the Flugabwehrkanonenpanzer Gepard SPAAGs.
 : 30 GDF-005 units
 : 15 GDF-002 35mm twin guns were captured during the Falklands War along with six Skyguard and one Super Fledermaus FC Radars. One of the Skyguard radars was destroyed from a Shrike missile strike during the conflict. Currently four of these Skyguard fire control systems are being used to detect UK military aircraft exceeding flight restrictions over residential areas. GDF-002 guns now in storage and in a few military museums in the U.K.

See also
 List of artillery
 List of anti-aircraft artillery
 List of artillery of Germany
 List of artillery of Switzerland
Related development
 Oerlikon Millennium 35 mm Naval Revolver Gun System
 Type 09 SPAAA

References
Notes

Bibliography

 Jane's Land-Based Air Defence 2005–2006, by James C O'Halloran, 
 RAF Harrier Ground Attack-Falklands, by Jerry Pook,  
 The Machine Gun, Volume V, George M. Chinn
 Rheinmetall page on 35 mm ammo
 La Artillería Argentina en Malvinas, by Horacio Rodríguez Mottino. 
 Weapons: Robot Cannon Goes Berserk, Kills 9

External links
 
 Official website
 Oerlikon Skyguard III Air Defense System on armyrecognition.com

35 mm artillery
Autocannon
Anti-aircraft guns
Anti-aircraft guns of Germany
Anti-aircraft guns of the Cold War
Artillery of Switzerland
Oerlikon-Contraves
Military equipment introduced in the 1960s